Qian Yuping (born October 6, 1966) is a Chinese professional Go player.

Biography 
Qian was born in Shanghai, China. He started playing Go when he was 6 years old. In 1987, he reached 9 dan, the highest rank. At the time he was one of the youngest 9 dans. A year later, he won his first title, the National Go Individual. In 1991, he made it all the way to the final of the Fujitsu Cup, but could not play due to health reasons.

Qian was one of China's best players during the 1990s.

Past titles & Runners-up

References 

Living people
1966 births
Go players from Shanghai